Butterfly Valley may refer to:

Places
 Butterfly Valley, a valley in north of Lai Chi Kok in New Kowloon of Hong Kong
 Butterfly Valley, Fethiye, a valley in Fethiye district of Muğla Province, Turkey
 Butterfly Valley Botanical Area, a protected botanical area in the northern Sierra Nevada, in Quincy of northeastern California, USA
 Valley of the Butterflies, Petaloudes Valley, Rhodes

Other uses
 Butterfly Valley: A Requiem, a book of poetry by the Danish writer Inger Christensen